William Dean Jessup (March 17, 1929 – January 3, 2015) was a professional American football player who played wide receiver for seven seasons for the San Francisco 49ers and Denver Broncos. He also played one season, 1959, with the British Columbia Lions of the Canadian Football League, where he was selected as an All-Star at defensive back.

References

1929 births
2015 deaths
American football wide receivers
BC Lions players
Denver Broncos (AFL) players
People from Yuma County, Colorado
Players of American football from Colorado
San Francisco 49ers players
USC Trojans football players